The knock-out stage of the 2014 CAF Champions League was played from 20 September to 1 November 2014. A total of four teams competed in the knock-out stage.

Qualified teams
The winners and runners-up of each of the two groups in the group stage qualified for the knock-out stage.

Format
Knock-out ties were played on a home-and-away two-legged basis. If the sides were level on aggregate after the second leg, the away goals rule was applied, and if still level, the tie proceeded directly to a penalty shoot-out (no extra time was played).

Schedule
The schedule of each round was as follows.

Semi-finals
In the semi-finals, the group A winners played the group B runners-up, and the group B winners played the group A runners-up, with the group winners hosting the second leg.

|}

4–4 on aggregate. ES Sétif won on the away goals rule and advanced to the final.

AS Vita Club won 4–2 on aggregate and advanced to the final.

Final

In the final, the order of legs was decided by a draw, held after the group stage draw (29 April 2014, 11:00 UTC+2, at the CAF Headquarters in Cairo, Egypt).

|}

3–3 on aggregate. ES Sétif won on the away goals rule.

References

External links
Orange CAF Champions League 2014, CAFonline.com

3